Dinu Popescu (born 27 June 1949) is a Romanian former water polo player. He competed at the 1972 Summer Olympics, the 1976 Summer Olympics and the 1980 Summer Olympics.

See also
 Romania men's Olympic water polo team records and statistics

References

External links
 

1949 births
Living people
Romanian male water polo players
Olympic water polo players of Romania
Water polo players at the 1972 Summer Olympics
Water polo players at the 1976 Summer Olympics
Water polo players at the 1980 Summer Olympics
Water polo players from Bucharest